is a passenger railway station located in the city of Anan, Tokushima Prefecture, Japan. It is operated by JR Shikoku and has the station number "M16".

Lines

Layout
The station consists of a side platform serving a single track. The station building is unstaffed and serves only as a waiting room. Access to the platform is by means of a ramp from the station building.

Adjacent stations

History
On 1 April 1987, with the privatization of Japanese National Railways (JNR), the successor of JGR, JR Shikoku took over control of the Station.

Passenger statistics
In fiscal 2019, the station was used by an average of 108 passengers daily

Surrounding area
Anan City Shinnohigashi Elementary School
Tokushima Prefectural Anan Hikari High School Shinno Campus
Byōdō-ji

See also
List of railway stations in Japan

References

External links

 JR Shikoku timetable

Railway stations in Tokushima Prefecture
Railway stations in Japan opened in 1937
Anan, Tokushima